Lewis Brown may refer to:

Lewis H. Brown (1894–1951), American industrialist and founder of the American Enterprise Association
Lewis H. Brown (American football) (1909–after 1960), American football player
Lewis Brown (Liberia) (21st century), Liberian politician
Lewis Brown (basketball) (1955–2011), American basketball player
Lewis Brown (rugby league) (born 1986), New Zealand rugby player
Lewis Brown (cricketer) (1874–1951), English cricketer
Lew Brown (1893–1958), American songwriter
Lew Brown (baseball) (1858–1889), American baseball player

See also
Lou Brown (born 1978), English singer-songwriter
Lou Brown (rugby league) (1905–1947), New Zealand rugby league footballer of the 1920s and 1930s
Louis Brown Athletic Center (opened 1977)